The Chinese Indonesian Democratic Party (()  was a political party that existed during the Guided Democracy era in Indonesia, from 1948 until 1965. The party identified itself as a supporter for the relationship between Indonesia and China, and supported the mandatory teaching of the Chinese language in Indonesian schools.

History

Background 

The two major ethnic Chinese political parties of the pre-revolutionary period, Chung Hwa Hui (CHH) and Partai Tionghoa Indonesia (PTI), were both disbanded in 1942 at the start of the Japanese occupation of Indonesia during World War II. The idea of reviving a political party for Chinese Indonesians was proposed as an initiative by the Sin Ming Hui Association. As a result, several heads of the Chinese diaspora in Indonesia were invited by the association to discuss about this matter. The discussion resulted in the formation of a preparatory committee.

The preparatory committee established the political party on 23 May 1948 as the Chinese Union, and the establishment was followed shortly with the First Congress of the Persatoean Tionghoa. It was a thinly guised revival of the colonial-era, centre-right party Chung Hwa Hui. The congress elected a former CHH board member Thio Thiam Tjong as the chairman of the party.

Development 
Two years after the party was established, the party already had twenty seven branches in the provinces of Indonesia, ranging from Medan to Ternate. The party had already enlisted tens of thousands members, and different Chinese organizations joined the party, such as C.H.T.H., Tionghoa Siang Hwee, Sin Ming Hui, and C.H.T.N.H, making it the largest political party for the Chinese Indonesians at that time.

In February 1950, Liem Koen Hian, founder of the colonial-era Partai Tionghoa Indonesia – CHH's old adversary – criticised the new Thio-led party as naive and incompetent, unable to deal with the indigenous Indonesian majority. Liem founded Persatuan Tenaga Indonesia (the 'Union of Indonesian Labour'), thus reviving the old colonial-era rivalry between CHH and PTI, but in a new post-revolutionary guise.

The party held its second congress in Jakarta on 11 until 12 March 1950. On the congress, the party's name was changed to the Chinese Indonesian Democratic Party.

The third party congress was held in Bandung on 11 until 13 August 1950. The party agreed to create and approve a new constitution.

References

Bibliography 

Political parties established in 1948
Political parties disestablished in 1965
1965 disestablishments in Indonesia
1948 establishments in Indonesia